Mooresville Senior High School, or more commonly Mooresville High School, is a high school located in Mooresville, North Carolina.  It is part of the Mooresville Graded School District and was opened in the 1930s.  The sports teams are known as the Blue Devils. Mooresville plays in the I-Meck Conference with Lake Norman (Rival), Hough (Rival), Hopewell, Mallard Creek, West Charlotte, Vance, North Meck. Mooresville Home is Coach Joe Popp Stadium located on the Magnolia Campus of Mooresville High School.

School information
For the 2015–2016 school year, Mooresville High School had a total population of 1,881 students and 82 teachers on a (FTE) basis. The student population had a gender ratio of 50.25% male to 49.75% female. The demographic group makeup of the student population was: White, 75.35%; Black, 16.46%; Hispanic, 4.73%; Asian/Pacific Islander, 1.89%; and American Indian, 0.13% (two or more races, 1.45%). For the same school year, 31.84% of the students received free and reduced-cost lunches.

Notable alumni 
 Rodney Childers, NASCAR Cup Series championship winning crew chief 
 Dale Earnhardt Jr., retired NASCAR Cup Series driver, member of the NASCAR Hall of Fame
 Jeffrey Earnhardt, NASCAR Xfinity Series driver
 John J. Mack, senior advisor to the investment firm Kohlberg Kravis Roberts and the former CEO & chairman of the board at Morgan Stanley
 J.B. Mauney, bull rider, 2x Professional Bull Riders (PBR) World Champion
 Jim Popp, sports executive
 J.R. Sweezy, NFL offensive guard, Super Bowl XLVIII champion with the Seattle Seahawks
 Forrest Thompson, MLB pitcher

References

External links
NCES
Official Website

Public high schools in North Carolina
Educational institutions established in the 1930s
Schools in Iredell County, North Carolina
1930s establishments in North Carolina